Libyan Parliament may refer to:

General People's Congress (Libya)
General National Congress
New General National Congress
House of Representatives (Libya)
High Council of State (Libya)